Eder Alberto Mancilla Mora (born 17 May 1986) is a Venezuelan football manager.

Career
In March 2015, he was sacked by the club.

On 4 September 2015, Mancilla was named manager of Tercera División side . The following April, he joined Juan Domingo Tolisano's staff at Carabobo, as an assistant manager.

Mancilla followed Tolisano to Mineros de Guayana, Deportivo Táchira and Chilean side Deportes Antofagasta, always as his assistant. On 28 March 2022, he was named manager of Primera División side Deportivo Lara, after Jorge Durán resigned.

Mancilla's first match in charge of the Rojinegro occurred on 31 March 2022, a 0–2 loss against former side Táchira. On 14 July, he resigned.

References

External links

1987 births
Living people
People from San Cristóbal, Táchira
Venezuelan football managers
Venezuelan Primera División managers
Venezuelan Segunda División managers
Asociación Civil Deportivo Lara managers